This is a list of lists of activists.

 List of abolitionists
 List of African-American abolitionists
 List of African American activists
 List of animal rights advocates
 List of animal rights groups
 List of anti-nuclear groups
 List of anti-war organizations
 List of assassinated human rights activists
 List of atheist activists and educators
 List of breastfeeding activists
 List of Chinese dissidents
 List of civil rights leaders
 List of disability rights activists
 List of environmental organizations
 List of feminists
 List of Indian independence activists
 List of Jewish American activists
 List of LGBT rights activists
 List of Muslim feminists
 List of Nigerian human rights activists
 List of opponents of slavery
 List of Pakistan Movement activists
 List of peace activists
 List of suffragists and suffragettes
 List of women's rights activists
 List of women pacifists and peace activists
 List of women climate scientists and activists